Leucoagaricus is a genus of fungi in the family Agaricaceae. Several fungus-growing ants cultivate multiple species for food. The genus contains approximately 90 species.

Taxonomy
This group of mushrooms was first defined as a subgenus of Leucocoprinus by Marcel Locquin in 1945, and it was then elevated to the status of genus by Rolf Singer in the journal Sydowia in 1948.  The group was characterized as belonging to family Agaricaceae with white, dirty cream or pink spores which are generally small (up to 10 µm) but much bigger in one species, with a germ pore, with a pseudo-amyloid multilayered membrane, simple or ornamented, which is metachromatic in cresyl blue.  The hyphae in the sporocarp are without clamp connections.  There is always a ring which is initially fixed (but later may be movable).

The type species is Leucoagaricus barssii (Zeller) Vellinga, which was formerly called L. macrorhizus.

Species

Select species include:
Leucoagaricus americanus
Leucoagaricus badhamii
Leucoagaricus barssii
Leucoagaricus erythrophaeus
Leucoagaricus gaillardii
Leucoagaricus gongylophorus
Leucoagaricus leucothites
Leucoagaricus meleagris
Leucoagaricus moseri
Leucoagaricus nympharum
Leucoagaricus rubrotinctus
Leucoagaricus sericifer

See also
List of Agaricaceae genera
List of Agaricales genera
List of Leucoagaricus species

References

 
Agaricales genera
Taxa named by Rolf Singer